The Terena people are an indigenous people of Brazil. Their traditional language is Terena. They live in the states of Mato Grosso, Mato Grosso do Sul, and São Paulo.

History and society
With the establishment of the Serviço de Proteção aos Índios in 1910, the definite allocation of Indian lands shortly afterwards, and the location of a government Indian Post near Taunay in 1916, the Terena people were placed under a reservation-like system.

Buriti farm incident
On 15 May 2013, a group of hundreds of Terena re-occupied a parcel of land, now owned by a local politician and rancher, that they believe is part of their Indigenous ancestral territory. The Buriti farm is in the Sidrolândia municipality. After two weeks of occupation, they were forcibly evicted on 30 May by local police. One of their members, 35-year-old Osiel Gabriel, was shot and killed by police during the eviction, and three others were injured. The Terena managed to regain control of the land on 1 June.

Covid-19 pandemic 
In 2020 indigenous peoples of Brazil, among which are the Terena, were severely hit by the Covid-19 pandemic and by a lack of response by the Brazilian government.

References

Further reading
 Terena

Indigenous peoples in Brazil
Indigenous peoples of the Amazon